Brandwein Nunataks are a pair of nunataks,  high, which lie close together and mark the northeast extent of the Nebraska Peaks. They were named by the Advisory Committee on Antarctic Names after S. (Sid) Brandwein, a member of the United States Antarctic Research Program geophysical field party, Ross Ice Shelf Project, 1973–74 field season.

See also
MacAyeal Peak

References
 

Nunataks of Oates Land